Kinniku may refer to:

Ataru Kinniku, character from Yudetamago's manga and anime series Kinnikuman and its sequel Kinnikuman Nisei
Kinniku Banzuke, weekly Japanese TV program and sports entertainment variety show of the Tokyo Broadcasting System (TBS)
Kinniku Shōjo Tai, Japanese rock band
Mayumi Kinniku, character in Yudetamago's manga and anime series Kinnikuman
Sayuri Kinniku, character from Yudetamago's manga and anime series Kinnikuman

See also
Kinnikuman, manga created by Yoshinori Nakai and Takashi Shimada